Blasteroids is the third official sequel to the 1979 multidirectional shooter video game, Asteroids. It was developed by Atari Games and released in arcades in 1987. Unlike the previous games, Blasteroids uses raster graphics instead of vector graphics, and has power-ups and a boss.

Home computer ports of Blasteroids were released by Image Works for the Amiga, Amstrad CPC, Atari ST, Commodore 64, MSX, MS-DOS, and ZX Spectrum. An emulated version of Blasteroids is an unlockable mini-game in Lego Dimensions.

Gameplay 

The gameplay is basically the same as for the original. The player controls a spaceship viewed from "above" in a 2D representation of space, by rotating the ship, and using thrust to give the ship momentum. To slow down or completely stop moving, the player has to rotate the ship to face the direction it came from, and generate the right amount of thrust to nullify its momentum. The ship has a limited amount of fuel to generate thrust with. This fuel comes in the form of "Energy" that is also used for the ship's Shields which protect it against collisions and enemy fire. Once all Energy is gone, the player's ship is destroyed. The ship can shoot to destroy asteroids and enemy ships. The ship can also be transformed at will into 3 different versions: the Speeder with greatest speed, the Fighter with the most firepower, and the Warrior with extra armor.

Levels 
At the start of the game, the player is in a screen with four warps indicating the game's difficulty: Easy, Medium, Hard, and Expert. Flying through any of the warps starts the game with that difficulty. Each has several galaxies, each with 9 or 16 sectors depending on difficulty. Once a sector is completed by destroying all the asteroids, an exit portal appears to lead the player to the galactic map screen. Similarly to the difficulty screen, the player can here choose which Sector to visit next. Completed and empty sectors can be revisited, but this costs energy. Sectors that are currently out of range are marked with a "?".

Each sector consists of only the visible screen with wraparound.

Objective 
The object of the game is to destroy all the asteroids which have a set speed at which they fly through the sector. Asteroids come in varying sizes, and when shot, larger asteroids break into multiple smaller ones. Only shooting the smallest ones will actually remove them from the sector. Asteroids also come in different types. Normal asteroids don't contain anything, but red asteroids can contain power-ups in the form of Power Crystals that are released by completely destroying asteroids. Crystals decay over time. Popcorn Asteroids require several hits, which expands their size, and eventually makes them stop spinning. They can't be destroyed, but stopping them is enough to finish each sector. Egg asteroids contain leeches which home in on the user's ship and suck out its energy. They can be shot and destroyed. Finally there are Seeker asteroids which home in on the player's ship after being shot.

Besides asteroids, there are different enemy ships trying to shoot the player, which leave equipment in the form of power-ups when destroyed.

The ships can collect equipment:
 Shields give limited amount of protection, indicated in HUD.
 Blasters give the ship double shots.
 Extra Shot Power allows shots to penetrate everything.
 Ripstar causes the ship to spin furiously, firing in all directions.
 Extra Fuel Capacity increases fuel capacity, indicated by the HUD. Depleting fuel reserves to critical with this increased capacity will revert the ship to normal fuel capacity.
 Booster increases movement speed for all ship forms.
 Crystal Magnet attracts loose Power Crystals to the ship.
 Cloak makes the ship invisible to enemies.

Boss 
Mukor is the alien boss, appearing after all sectors are cleared of asteroids. He will try to ram the player and will send miniature enemy ships to aid him. Mukor has tentacles which all must be shot multiple times to be destroyed. Once all tentacles are gone, Mukor is defeated and he will leave some special equipment. He will reappear in the next galaxy with a larger number of tentacles, making him harder to defeat. Mukor must be defeated in all galaxies to be fully conquered and for the player to win the game.

Multiplayer 
A second player can join the game at any time by pressing the Fire button, using 1 credit and turning Blasteroids into a multiplayer game. Both players can cooperate by covering each other, as well as by docking their ships into the Starlet. Docking is possible if one ship is a Speeder, and the other is a Warrior; flying over each other will turn the Speeder into a stationary Turret with more firepower, on top of the Warrior, which turns into a Spiaret, with less firepower but full control. The ships undock when either player transforms their ship into something else again. The first player to exit through the Exit Portal gets a large bonus and control of the Galactic Map.

References

External links 
 
 Blasteroids at Arcade History

1987 video games
Amiga games
Amstrad CPC games
Arcade video games
Atari arcade games
Atari ST games
Commodore 64 games
DOS games
MSX games
Midway video games
Multidirectional shooters
Multiplayer and single-player video games
Video game remakes
Video games scored by Ben Daglish
Video games scored by Brad Fuller
Video games developed in the United States
ZX Spectrum games
Image Works games